Yellow Creek State Park is a Pennsylvania state park on  in Brush Valley and Cherryhill Townships, Indiana County, Pennsylvania in the United States. The park encompasses parts of Yellow Creek and Little Yellow Creek. The old Kittanning Path goes through the parkland. The park was established in 1963. An additional  of developed land were purchased in 1982. Yellow Creek Lake, a  man-made lake, was built in 1969 by an earth and rock dam on Yellow Creek. Yellow Creek State Park is between the boroughs of Ebensburg and Indiana on U.S. Route 422.

Environmental awareness
Yellow Creek State Park became the first Pennsylvania state park to switch from gasoline-powered lawn mowers to propane powered lawn mowers in 2008. This is part of a statewide effort to make the state parks more environmentally friendly. The propane mower reduces emissions by 90% and boosts fuel efficiency by 10%. Yellow Creek state park has taken other steps to reduce man's impact on the environment. These include installing wind turbines to provide electric power to the environmental education building. The buildings have been remodeled with better window placement in order to take advantage of the sun's rays. A new boat that uses less fuel has been purchased to patrol Yellow Creek Lake. Lastly, park rangers and educators are using bicycles instead of trucks whenever possible.

Hiking
Ridgetop Trail is the most challenging of the trails. Laurel Run Trail is a  loop trail in the vicinity of the park office.

Picnicking
Yellow Creek State Park is a popular destination for groups and families for picnicking. The main picnic area is near the beach with parking for over 4,000 people and a large number of picnic tables. There are three pavilions in the main picnic area. The pavilions may be reserved up to 11 months in advance. Unreserved picnic tables are available on a first come first served basis.

Camping
Six cottages and 4 yurts are available to rent at Yellow Creek State Park. The cottages are on the lakeshore near McFeather's Cove. They sleep up to five in single or double bunks. They have wooden floors, glass windows, a porch, and electric lights. The yard area of the cottages have picnic tables and fire rings. The yurts also sleep up to five in single or double bunks. They are a bit more modern than the cottages. Each yurt has a refrigerator and stove as well as tables, chairs and electric lights and heat.

Yellow Creek Lake
Boats up to 20 horsepower are permitted on the waters of Yellow Creek Lake. There are three launch areas on the lake. All boats must display a current registration from any state or a launch permit from the Pennsylvania Fish and Boat Commission.  Boats are available to rent near the beach area, including canoes, kayaks, sailboats, paddleboats, and motorized pontoon boats.

An  beach is open from Memorial Day weekend through Labor Day weekend. Beginning in 2008 lifeguards will not be posted at the beach. There is a large bathhouse at the beach that also serves as the first-aid station and snack bar.

Hunting and fishing
Hunting is permitted at Yellow Creek State Park.  Hunters are expected to follow the rules and regulations of the Pennsylvania Game Commission. The common game species are eastern gray squirrels, wild turkey, white-tailed deer, ruffed grouse, common pheasant, American black bear, waterfowl, and eastern cottontail rabbits. The hunting of groundhogs is prohibited.

Yellow Creek Lake is a warm water fishery. The common game fish are pike, muskellunge, bass, perch, crappie and bluegill. Laurel Run, Little Yellow Creek and Yellow Creek are cold water fisheries. These streams are stocked with trout by the Pennsylvania Fish and Boat Commission. All fishers are expected to follow the rules and regulations of the fish commission at all times.

Nearby state parks
The following state parks are within  of Yellow Creek State Park:

Blue Knob State Park (Bedford County)
Keystone State Park (Westmoreland County)
Laurel Mountain State Park (Westmoreland County)
Laurel Ridge State Park (Cambria, Fayette, Somerset, and Westmoreland Counties)
Laurel Summit State Park (Westmoreland County)
Linn Run State Park (Westmoreland County)
Prince Gallitzin State Park (Cambria County)

Photo Gallery

References

External links

Park Spotlight
  

Protected areas established in 1963
State parks of Pennsylvania
Parks in Indiana County, Pennsylvania
Protected areas of Indiana County, Pennsylvania